Matej Sabanov (born 25 June 1992) is a Serbian tennis player who formerly represented Croatia. He has won one ATP doubles title and 28 ITF doubles titles. Sabanov has a career high ATP singles ranking of 640 achieved on 20 October 2014. He also has a career high ATP doubles ranking of World No. 72 achieved on 18 April 2022.

Professional career 
Sabanov made his ATP main draw debut at the 2018 Croatia Open Umag in the doubles draw partnering his twin brother Ivan.

His best career performance came in 2021 when he won his first ATP doubles title by winning Serbia Open with his brother Ivan. They defeated Gonzalo Escobar and Ariel Behar in the final.

ATP career finals

Doubles: 2 (1 title, 1 runners-up)

ATP Challenger and ITF Futures finals

Singles: 2 (1–1)

Doubles: 71 (30–41)

References

External links
 
 

1992 births
Living people
Serbian male tennis players
Sportspeople from Subotica
Sportspeople from Osijek
Croats of Vojvodina
Croatian male tennis players